List by Family Name: A - B - C - D - E - F - G - H - I - J - K - M - N - O - R - S - T - U - W - Y - Z

 Edogawa Ranpo (October 21, 1894 – July 28, 1965)
 Rokusuke Ei (born 1933)
 Eiji Yoshikawa (1892-1962)
 Ekuni Kaori (born March 21, 1964)
 Emi Suiin (August 12, 1869 – November 3, 1934)
 Enchi Fumiko (1905 – November 12, 1986)
 Enjoe Toh (born September 15, 1972)
 Enokido Yoji (born 1963)
 Endo Shusaku (March 27, 1923 – September 29, 1996)
 Eto Jun (born 1933)

E